Emperor of Dreams: A Clark Ashton Smith Bibliography is a bibliography of Clark Ashton Smith by Donald Sidney-Fryer.  It was first published by Donald M. Grant, Publisher, Inc. in 1978 in an edition of 1,375 copies.

References

1978 non-fiction books
American non-fiction books
Bibliographies of people
Books about books
Science fiction studies
Published bibliographies
Donald M. Grant, Publisher books